The Nordic Athletics Championships was an international athletics competition between Nordic countries – Finland, Sweden, Norway, Denmark and Iceland. It was held on three occasions, in 1961, 1963 and 1965.

Events
The competition programme featured a total of 34 individual Nordic Championship athletics events, 22 for men and 12 for women. The limited number of events for women reflected that of the Olympic programme of the time.

Running
100 metres, 200 metres, 400 metres, 800 metres, 1500 metres (men only), 5000 metres (men only), 10,000 metres (men only), marathon (men only)
Obstacle events
80 metres hurdles (women only), 110 metres hurdles (men only), 400 metres hurdles (men only), 3000 metres steeplechase (men only)
Jumping events
Pole vault (men only), high jump, long jump, triple jump (men only)
Throwing events
Shot put, discus throw, javelin throw, hammer throw (men only)
Relays
4 × 100 metres relay, 4 × 400 metres relay (men only)
Combined events
Pentathlon (women only), decathlon (men only)

Editions

References

 
Nordic Athletics competitions
Recurring sporting events established in 1961
Recurring sporting events disestablished in 1965
1961 establishments in Europe
1965 disestablishments in Europe
Defunct athletics competitions